Ruthenocene is an organoruthenium compound with the formula (C5H5)2Ru.  This pale yellow, volatile solid is classified as a sandwich compound and more specifically, as a metallocene.

Structure and bonding
Ruthenocene consists of a ruthenium ion sandwiched in between two cyclopentadienyl rings. It features ruthenium centre bound symmetrically to the planes of two cyclopentadienyl rings.  It is closely related to the isoelectronic ferrocene.

In contrast to ferrocene, wherein the cyclopentadienyl rings are in a staggered conformation, those of ruthenocene crystallise with an eclipsed conformation.  This difference is due to the larger ionic radius of ruthenium, which increases the distance between the cyclopentadienyl rings, decreasing steric interactions and allowing an eclipsed conformation to prevail.  In solution, these rings rotate with a very low barrier.

Preparation
Ruthenocene was first synthesized in 1952 by Geoffrey Wilkinson, a Nobel laureate who had collaborated in assigning the structure of ferrocene only a year earlier.  Originally, ruthenocene was prepared by the reaction of ruthenium trisacetylacetonate with excess of cyclopentadienylmagnesium bromide. 
Ru(acac)3  +  3 C5H5MgBr  →   Ru(C5H5)2  +  3 "acacMgBr"  +  "C5H5"

Ruthenocene may also be prepared by the reaction of sodium cyclopentadienide with "ruthenium dichloride" prepared in situ by reduction of ruthenium trichloride.

Chemical properties
Ruthenocene typically oxidises via  two electron change, instead of one. With weakly coordinating anions as electrolyte, the oxidation proceeds via a 1e step.

Ruthenocene has been investigated as a photoinitiator for polymerization reactions.

References

Metallocenes
Organoruthenium compounds
Ruthenium(II) compounds